Postbiotics - also known as metabiotics, biogenics, or simply metabolites - are soluble factors (metabolic products or byproducts), secreted by live bacteria, or released after bacterial lysis providing physiological benefits to the host.

However, this term is sometimes also used with regards to paraprobiotics - immobilised probiotics, which when ingested, may have the ability to exert positive biological responses and restore intestinal homeostasis in a similar manner to probiotics. 
Paraprobiotics are currently being referred to as modified, inactivated, non-viable, para- or ghost probiotics. Probiotics are widely used and accepted in many countries in clinical practice. Paraprobiotics, the immobilised version of probiotics are gaining traction in recent years due to the concerns about the possibility of low tolerance of probiotics, especially in paediatric populations and in severely ill or immunocompromised patients.   Paraprobiotics seem to have similar beneficial properties as live probiotics with fewer of the constraints associated with unstable, diminishing bacteria.

Paraprobiotics types 

Paraprobiotics could be generated using different methods:
 Heat-inactivation (also includes tyndallisation)
 Ultraviolet-inactivated
 Chemical treatment (e.g. formalin)
 Gamma-irradiation
 Sonication

In most cases heat treatment is considered the method of choice for deactivating probiotic strains. The effect that different types of inactivation have on bacterial structure and components as well as the maintenance of probiotic properties requires further research.

Mechanism of action 
The mechanisms of action for paraprobiotics is less understood, though the possible mechanisms include immune system regulation and interference with pathogen attachment to host cells. Limited research hypothesises that immobilised paraprobiotics release key bacterial components, such as lipoteichoic acids, peptidoglycans, or exopolysaccharides which exhibit key immunomodulating effects and antagonising properties against pathogens.

General paraprobiotics applications 
As paraprobiotics are newly emerging, so is the evidence to support the use of paraprobiotics. Emerging clinical and pre-clinical studies have demonstrated that paraprobiotics play a role in general health and well-being and for improving host immune function like that of probiotics. It is paraproulated that paraprobiotics induce changes in the gut microbiome and the altered gut microbial composition is associated with increased levels of innate and acquired immunity biomarkers. paraprobiotics also seem to exhibit antioxidant effects and has indicated its potential applications in food and pharmaceutical industries.

Paraprobiotics applications in biotherapy 
Paraprobiotics (mostly heat-killed) have been evaluated in small study sizes and seem to be beneficial for the following clinical applications:

 Gastrointestinal diseases (bloating, paediatric disorders, infantile colic, diarrhea, extra-intestinal diseases) 
 Upper respiratory tract infections 
 Ocular disorders including eye fatigue
 There is a growing body of pre-clinical evidence supporting the use of paraprobiotics for the following applications:
 Asthma
 Inflammatory bowel diseases (ulcerative colitis)
 Colitis-associated colorectal cancer
 Type 2 Diabetes (improved glycemic parameters)
 Liver injury
 Atopic dermatitis
 Influenza viruses
 Cardiac injury

Species used as paraprobiotics 
Many species of bacteria have been identified to have benefits as paraprobiotic strains:

 Bifidobacterium breve 
 Bifidobacterium infantis 
 Bifidobacterium longum 
 Enterococcus faecalis 
 Lactobacillus acidophilus 
 Lactobacillus brevis
 Lactobacillus bulgaricus 
 Lactobacillus casei
 Lactobacillus delbrueckii subsp. Bulgaricus
 Lactobacillus fermentum 
 Lactobacillus johnsonii 
 Lactobacillus paracasei 
 Lactobacillus plantarum 
 Lactobacillus reuteri
 Lactobacillus salivarius 
 Lactococcus lactis
 Streptococcus salivarius subsp. thermophilus

References 

Probiotics